The 25th Anniversary Album is the fourteenth studio album by Australian country singer Lee Kernaghan. It was released digitally and physically in Australia on 24 March 2017 through ABC Music.

Background and release
On 19 January 2017, the album was announced to mark the 25th anniversary of Kernaghan's country number one single, "Boys from the Bush", and the release of his debut album, The Outback Club (1992). Kernaghan has since had 34 number one hits on the Australian country music charts, won 36 Golden Guitars and has sold over two million albums in Australia. Kernaghan also performed a 25th anniversary show in Tamworth on 26 January 2017.

Track listing
 "Drive On" – 2:51
 "Back in '92" (featuring James Blundell) – 3:09
 "Yaraka Dust" – 3:03
 "Outback Club Reunion" – 4:00
 "Island of Oceans" (with John Williamson) – 2:45
 "Trip Around the Sun" (with The McClymonts) – 3:20
 "Damn Good Mates" with The Wolfe Brothers) – 3:02
 "Walk a Country Mile" (with Troy Cassar-Daley and Kasey Chambers) – 3:46
 "High Country" (with Robby) – 3:23
 "Ned Kelly" with Adam Harvey) – 3:52
 "Dumb Things" (with Adam Brand) – 2:41
 "Somewhere Between" (with Tania Kernaghan) – 3:01
 "Nothin' On" – 3:23

Charts

Weekly charts

Year-end charts

Release history

References

Lee Kernaghan albums
2017 albums